Rainer Vakra (born 10 March 1981 in Tallinn) is an Estonian politician. He has been a member of XII and XIII Riigikogu.

In 2002 he graduated from Tallinn University in environmental management.

From 2005 to 2011 he was the elder of Nõmme District.

From 2005 to 2012 he was a member of Estonian Centre Party and from 2013 to 2021 he was a member of Estonian Social Democratic Party.

References

Living people
1981 births
Social Democratic Party (Estonia) politicians
Members of the Riigikogu, 2011–2015
Members of the Riigikogu, 2015–2019
Tallinn University alumni
Politicians from Tallinn